American hip hop duo Mobb Deep have released eight studio albums, four compilation albums, five mixtapes, one extended play (EP), forty singles (including ten as a featured artist), seven promotional singles and twenty-four music videos.

Albums

Studio albums

Compilation albums

Mixtapes

Extended plays

Singles

As lead artist

As featured artist

Promotional singles

Other charted songs

Guest appearances

Music videos

As lead artist

As featured artist

Notes

References

External links
 Official website
 
 
 

Hip hop discographies
 
Discographies of American artists